Multifurca furcata is a rare mushroom-forming fungus in the genus Multifurca. It was originally described as a Lactarius species in 1918 and was moved to the new genus Multifurca in 2008. With the genus Lactarius it shares the exudation of milk-like latex; however, it is microscopically and molecularly distinct. It has been found very infrequently, with currently known localities in the United States, Mexico, Costa Rica, and China.

References

External links
 Russulales News / Multifurca furcata

Russulales
Fungi described in 1918